Benjamin Blackiston House, also known as Deer Park, is a historic home located at Kenton, Kent County, Delaware.  It was built about 1760, and is a -story, three bay, vernacular frame dwelling. It was originally built on the Penn plan, but later enlarged to six bays.

It was listed on the National Register of Historic Places in 1983.

References

External links

Houses on the National Register of Historic Places in Delaware
Houses completed in 1760
Houses in Kent County, Delaware
Kenton, Delaware
Historic American Buildings Survey in Delaware
National Register of Historic Places in Kent County, Delaware